Shahr-e Shib (also Romanized as Shahr-e Shīb; also known as Shahr-e Shīv) is a village in Gowharan Rural District, Gowharan District, Bashagard County, Hormozgan Province, Iran. At the 2006 census, its population was 209, in 42 families.

References 

Populated places in Bashagard County